This page lists the winners and nominees for the Soul Train Music Award for Best Collaboration. This category was created in the 2009 ceremony and since its creation, Chris Brown is the only artist to win the award twice.

Winners and nominees
Winners are listed first and highlighted in bold.

2000s

2010s

2020s

See also
 Soul Train Music Award for Best R&B/Soul Single – Group, Band or Duo

References

Soul Train Music Awards
Song awards